In mathematics, a Suslin representation of a set of reals (more precisely, elements of Baire space) is a tree whose projection is that set of reals.  More generally, a subset A of κω is λ-Suslin if there is a tree T on κ × λ such that A = p[T].

By a tree on κ × λ we mean here a subset T of the union of κi × λi for all i ∈ N (or i < ω in set-theoretical notation).

Here, p[T] = { f | ∃g : (f,g) ∈ [T] } is the projection of T,
where [T] = { (f, g ) | ∀n ∈ ω : (f(n), g(n) ∈ T } is the set of branches through T.

Since [T] is a closed set for the product topology on κω × λω where κ and λ are equipped with the discrete topology (and all closed sets in  κω × λω come in this way from some tree on κ × λ), λ-Suslin subsets of κω are projections of closed subsets in κω × λω.

When one talks of Suslin sets without specifying the space, then one usually means Suslin subsets of R, which descriptive set theorists usually take to be the set ωω.

See also
Suslin cardinal
Suslin operation

External links
 R. Ketchersid, The strength of an ω1-dense ideal on ω1 under CH, 2004.

Set theory